Johann Beckenschlager, also known as Johann Beckensloer, Johann Pflueger or Johann Peckensloer, (c. 1435 in Breslau  –   15 December 1489 in Salzburg) was Archbishop of Gran and as John III Archbishop of Salzburg.
Born the son of a blacksmith. Matthias Corvinus made him the dean of Pécs and on 17 May 1465 the Bishop of Várad. In 1468 he became Bishop of Eger and in 1473 Archbishop of Esztergom and Primate of Hungary. Because he lost the favor of the Hungarian king, he left Hungary on 13 February 1476 and joined the Emperor Frederick III to whom he was consultant and financiers. From 22 March 1477 he coadjutor for the seriously ill bishop of Vienna, Leo von Spaur, and on 14 January 1482 as John III. Archbishop of Salzburg, and in 1487 became archbishop.

Johann was more secular warlord than spiritual leader and archbishop. He gladly showed up in full armor and went on the field. He was particularly renowned for his extraordinary physical strength. This archbishop also loved the creature comforts and used the secret passage of his predecessor to his concubines often. Beck was unpopular with the populus. He was a diplomat for Emperor Frederick III. working abroad. Styria and in 1483/84 the Netherlands. On 21 June 1486, Emperor appointed him governor of Austria (Upper and Lower Austria), Styria, Carinthia, Carniola, Istria and the Karst. From May 1486 he was responsible for the recruitment of imperial mercenaries in the war against his former king, the Hungarian king.

His last years were spent by the ailing Archbishop on the Hohensalzburg Fortress, which he had determined to expand. Including princely residence and  granary (temporarily used as a living room) and workhouse.

References

Bishops of Vienna
15th-century Roman Catholic bishops in Austria
Archbishops of Esztergom
1489 deaths
Bishops of Eger
Roman Catholic archbishops of Salzburg